Mirhusein Narziyev is the chairman of the Socialist Party of Tajikistan.

See also
Politics of Tajikistan

References

Living people
Socialist Party of Tajikistan politicians
Year of birth missing (living people)
Place of birth missing (living people)